Gonzalo Garcia may refer to:

 Gonzalo García (basketball) (born 1967), Argentine basketball coach
 Gonzalo García (cyclist) (born 1976), Argentine cyclist
 Gonzalo Garcia (dancer), New York City Ballet principal dancer 
 Gonzalo García (footballer, born 1983), Spanish football manager and former player who currently manages FC Twente
 Gonzalo García (footballer, born 1987), Argentine football defender currently playing for Racing Ferrol
 Gonzalo García (rugby union, born 1984), former Argentina-born Italian international rugby union centre
 Gonzalo García (rugby union, born 1999), Argentine international rugby union scrum-half
 Gonzalo García (sailor) (born 1935), Uruguayan Olympic sailor
 Gonzalo García (athlete)(born 1995), Spanish athlete
 Gonzalo García Núñez (born 1947), Peruvian industrial engineer
 Gonzalo García Zorro (died 1566), Spanish conquistador

See also
 Gonsalo Garcia (1556–1597), Roman Catholic Franciscan friar from India